The following is a list of Paramount Pictures executives.

Paramount executives
 W. W. Hodkinson
 Hiram Abrams
 Jesse L. Lasky
 Samuel Goldwyn
 Emanuel Cohen
 Ernst Lubitsch
 B. P. Schulberg
 George Weltner
 William LeBaron
 Walter Wanger
 Y. Frank Freeman
 Jacob Karp
 Charles Bluhdorn
 Robert Evans
 David Picker
 Michael D. Eisner
 Martin S. Davis
 Ned Tanen
 Barry London
 John Goldwyn
 Sumner Redstone

President
1916–1936: Adolph Zukor
1936–1964: Barney Balaban
1964-1967: George Weltner
1967–1969: Charles Bluhdorn
1971–1975: Frank Yablans
1976–1984: Michael Eisner
1988–1990: Sid Ganis
1992-2004: Sherry Lansing
2005-2007: Gail Berman
2021–present Brian Robbins

Executive Vice President
 1965-1967: Martin S. Davis
 1970–1977: Stanley R. Jaffe
 1992-after 2001: William Bernstein
 2000–present: Mark Badagaliacca

Senior Vice President
 1993–2000: Mark Badagaliacca

Chief Executive Officer
 1974–1984: Barry Diller
 1984–1991: Frank Mancuso, Sr.
 1992–2004: Sherry Lansing
 2005–2017: Brad Grey
 2017–2021: Jim Gianopulos
 2021–present: Brian Robbins

Chief Operating Officer
 1970–1977: Stanley R. Jaffe
 2006–2016: Frederick Huntsberry
 2016–present: Andrew Gumpert

Chief Financial Officer
 1997–present: Mark Badagaliacca

Chief Marketing Officer
 2011–2014: Josh Greenstein

Chairman of the Board
 1936-1964: Adolph Zukor
 1964-1966: Barney Balaban
 1966-1974: Charles Bluhdorn
 1974–1984: Barry Diller
 1984–1991: Frank Mancuso, Sr.
 1991–1992: Brandon Tartikoff
 1992–2005: Jonathan Dolgen
 2005–2017: Brad Grey
 2017–2021: Jim Gianopulos
 2021–present: Brian Robbins

Chairman Emeritus
 1964-1976: Adolph Zukor

Vice Chairman
 2008–2016: Rob Moore

President, Motion Picture Group
 1984-1988: Ned Tanen
 1988-1990 Sid Ganis and Barry London
 1990–1993: David Kirkpatrick and Barry London
 2008-2009: John Lesher
 2009–2015: Adam Goodman
 2015–2017: Marc Evans
 2018–2020: Wyck Godfrey
 2020–2021: Emma Watts
 2021–present: Mike Ireland and Daria Cercek

Head of Production
 1960–1964: Martin Rackin
 1964–1966: Howard W. Koch

President of Production
 1981—1982: Don Simpson
 1982—1984: Jeffrey Katzenberg
 1985—1987: Dawn Steel
 1987—1991: Gary Lucchesi
 1991—1997: John Goldwyn
 1997—2005: Michelle Manning
 2005—2007: Brad Weston & Allison Shearmur
 2007—2008: Brad Weston
 2008—2009: Adam Goodman
 2010—2015: Marc Evans
 2017—2020: Elizabeth Raposo
 2021–present: Mike Ireland & Daria Cercek

Vice President of Production
 1980–1983: Dawn Steel
 2003–2006: Marc Evans
 2017–present: Jon Gonda

Senior Vice President of Production
 1983—1985: Dawn Steel
 1991—1994: Michelle Manning
 2006—2008: Marc Evans

Executive Vice President of Production
 1994—1997: Archbold Sedney 
 2008—2010: Marc Evans

President of Worldwide Marketing
 2018-2019: David Sameth

President of Worldwide Marketing and Distribution
 2014–2017: Megan Colligan (president of domestic marketing & distribution 2011-14)
2019–present: Marc Weinstock

Executive Vice President of Creative Advertising
 2005–2008: Josh Greenstein

President, Home Media Distribution
 2011–present: Hal Richardson

President of Worldwide Home Media Distribution
 2011–2015: Dennis Maguire
 2015-Present: Bob Buchi

References

Paramount